Tom Heyes, professionally known as Blackhaine, is an English experimental musician, rapper and choreographer.

Biography
Born and raised in Preston, Lancashire, Heyes began to explore contemporary dance in his adolescence while taking interest in experimental music, developing an abrasive style of dance that would often leave him bloodied and bruised. After starring in several music videos, Heyes subsequently began independently producing music, later releasing the EPs And Salford Falls Apart and Armour II.

References

1990s births
British noise musicians
English experimental musicians
English industrial musicians
Living people